Alexander Botkin (March 4, 1801March 5, 1857) was an American politician in Madison, Wisconsin. He served one term each as a member of the Wisconsin State Senate and Wisconsin State Assembly.

Biography
Born in Kentucky, he moved to Alton, Illinois, where he was a justice of the peace. During that time, he was involved in events as a result of the murder of the abolitionist Elijah P. Lovejoy, trying to maintain peace during the riots. In 1841, he moved to the Wisconsin Territory, where he practiced law with Alexander Pope Field, the Secretary of the Wisconsin Territory. During that time, he served in the Wisconsin Territorial Legislature from 1847 to 1848 as a Whig and in the first Wisconsin Constitutional Convention of 1846. In 1849, Botkin was elected to the Wisconsin State Senate, where he served for two years until his defeat. In 1852, he was elected to the Wisconsin State Assembly. His son was Alexander Campbell Botkin, who was Lieutenant Governor of Montana. He died of a stroke in Sun Prairie, Wisconsin and was buried in Madison, Wisconsin.

Notes

People from Kentucky
People from Alton, Illinois
Politicians from Madison, Wisconsin
Wisconsin Whigs
Illinois state court judges
Members of the Wisconsin Territorial Legislature
19th-century American politicians
Members of the Wisconsin State Assembly
Wisconsin state senators
1801 births
1857 deaths
19th-century American judges